Swampy Cree (variously known as Maskekon, Maskegon and Omaškêkowak, and often anglicized as Omushkego) is a variety of the Algonquian language, Cree. It is spoken in a series of Swampy Cree communities in northern Manitoba, central northeast of Saskatchewan along the Saskatchewan River and along the Hudson Bay coast and adjacent inland areas to the south and west, and Ontario along the coast of Hudson Bay and James Bay. Within the group of dialects called "West Cree", it is referred to as an "n-dialect", as the variable phoneme common to all Cree dialects appears as "n" in this dialect (as opposed to y, r, l, or ð; all of the phonemes are considered a linguistic reflex of Proto-Algonquian *r).

It had approximately 4,500 speakers in a population of 5,000 as of 1982 according to the 14th edition of the Ethnologue. Canadian census data does not identify specific dialects of Cree (all estimates now current rely on extrapolations from specific studies), and currently, no accurate census of any Algonquian language exists.

The grammar and the examples used on this page are taken from Ellis's Second Edition (1983) of Spoken Cree.

Dialects
A division is sometimes made between West Swampy Cree and East Swampy Cree.

Communities recognized as West Swampy Cree include Shoal Lake, The Pas, Easterville, Chemawawin Cree Nation, Grand Rapids Barren Lands, Churchill, Split Lake, York Factory, Fox Lake, Shamattawa, and God's Lake Narrows (all in Manitoba) and Fort Severn, Ontario.

Communities recognized as East Swampy Cree are Weenusk, Attawapiskat, Albany Post, Kashechewan, and Fort Albany (all in Ontario). The Cree spoken at Kashechewan also shows Moose Cree influence.

This page reflects the forms found in Albany Post (now Kashechewan).

Phonology

Consonants

The consonant inventory for Swampy Cree contains 11 phonemes. A twelfth phoneme /l/ is not native but has entered the language via loanwords and influence from Moose Cree.

Voicing does not cause phonemic contrast in Swampy Cree. According to Ellis, however, stops often undergo voicing intervocalically when preceded by a stressed long vowel or nasal. For example, "māci" is pronounced [māːd͡zi], and "maci" is pronounced [mat͡si].

Preaspiration of stops creates a phonemic distinction. For example, "pētāw" (he brings it) is not the same as "pēhtāw" (he waits for it).

In emphatic words that contain an initial vowel, [h] is often inserted before the vowel. It is not a phonemic distinction but simply an indicator of stress. Similarly, word-final vowels are often followed by moderate aspiration, which does not mark any change in meaning. Postaspiration is not phonemically distinctive either.

The consonant /h/ is occasionally pronounced as [j] (as in English "yes") intervocalically.

When a short vowel is dropped, leaving a nasal next to a stop, the nasal assimilates to the same place of articulation as the stop. For example, "nipāskisikan" becomes "mpāskisikan".

In words such as ocawāšimiša, the [c] is actually an underlying /t/, assimilated by preparation for the articulation of the two [š]. In fact, pronunciation with a [t] is perceived as baby talk.

In word-final position, /t/ becomes [š].

Vowels

Vowels in Cree can experience a great deal of variation but remain one phoneme. Long /ō/ varies between [ō] and [ū] but remains one phoneme. Long /ā/ varies between approximately [ǣ] as in "hat") and [ɑ̄] (as in "hall").  Short /i/ varies between [ɪ] and [ɛ].  Short /o/ varies between approximately [o] and [ʊ]. Short /a/ has the widest variation, from [æ] to [ʌ] and [ɛ] as well, when it proceeds the approximant [j].

Contractions
 /Cw/ + /i/ yields /Co/
 /aw/ + /i/ yields /ā/

Stress
Stress is not distinctive in Swampy Cree.  In other words, there are no minimal pairs of words that are distinguishable only by stress.

Morphology
Swampy Cree is a polysynthetic language that relies heavily on verbs so many things that would be expressed in English nouns or adjectives are expressed as verbs. In fact, Swampy Cree has no adjectives at all.  Instead, it has the intransitive form of verbs. For example, instead of saying, "He is strong," in Cree, one says something like "He strongs."

Nouns
Nouns in Swampy Cree have both free and bound stems, the latter being used in combination with other morphemes.  Compounds are common and can be formed from other nouns, verb stems, and particles.

Swampy Cree does not have gender in the Indo-European sense (masculine, feminine and neuter). Rather, it differentiates between animate and inanimate (see Animacy). While no living things are within the "inanimate" class, there are some nonliving things (socks, kettles, stones, paddles, etc.) within the "animate" class.

Personal possessor prefixes
Possession is also expressed via affixation. The first- and second-person prefixes are the same as for verbs.

There are groups of nouns that have a dependent stem and must occur with some sort of possessor. They include relatives, body parts and things that are regarded in Algonquian tradition as extremely personal items, such as hunting bags. Possession is also occasionally marked by the suffix /-im/ (known as the possessed theme), which occurs inside the suffix for plurality when it occurs. The /(a)/ suffix is added when the possessed item is animate.

With plural nouns (as opposed to the possessors), the suffix /-ak/ (for animate) or /-a/ (for inanimate) is added after all other suffixes.

Obviative is marked on animate nouns as the suffix /-a/ and on inanimate nouns as the suffix /-iliw/.  Animate obviative nouns do not mark number so it is unknown whether an obviative noun is singular or plural.  Inanimate obviative nouns are marked for plurality. Surobviative nouns show neither the number of the noun itself nor the number of the possessor.

Pronouns
While person and possession are often expressed by affixation in Cree, there are separate personal pronouns, which are often used for emphasis.

Demonstratives

There is a further distinction in the Fort Albany region between "kotak" (another) and "kotakīy" (another one of two).

Verbs
As stated above, Swampy Cree relies heavily on verbs to express many things that are expressed in other ways in languages like English. For example, noun incorporation is quite common in Cree.

Both transitive and intransitive verbs in Swampy Cree change their endings (and occasionally even their stems) depending on animacy. Intransitive verbs rely on the animacy of their subjects while transitive verbs rely on the animacy of their objects.

There are multiple forms of the verbs.  The Independent Order of the verb is the set of verb forms that are used in the main clause. The Conjunct Order consists of the forms used in other types of clauses. Also, Swampy Cree has suffixes for direct action as opposed to inverse. The labels not to the quality of the action but which person is acting on which other grammatical person. For example, "I see him/her" (ni...wāpam...ā...w) is a direct action because the first person is acting upon the third and "He/she sees me" (ni...wāpam...ikw...w) because it is the third person acting upon the first. In Cree, the order of "directness" is second person, first person, third person.

Transitive Inanimate Verbs and Animate Intransitive Verbs also have the option of relational or non-relational forms. Relational forms are for when the verb is carried out in relation to another person. A famous example from the translation of the Pilgrim's Progress is kici-pēci-itohtē-w-ak, which comes from "evangelist bid me come hither" but literally translates to "that I come hither (in relation to him)."

Swampy Cree has two types of imperatives: Immediate Imperative and Future Imperative. As the name implies, the Immediate Imperative is for actions that should be carried out immediately, and the Future Imperative is for actions that should be carried out after a lapse of time.

Order of affixes
1) Person:
There are two "subject" prefixes for Cree Verbs for first person (/ni(t)-/) and second person (/ki(t)-/). The third person is unmarked. The prefixes are used simultaneously with suffixes that express number, animacy, and transitivity.

2) Tense:
Future tense is expressed by a prefix /-ka-/ in the first and second person and /ta-/ in the third person.  The future tense marker is inserted after the person marker (if any). In casual speech, it is often contracted with the person marker (example: nika- becomes n'ka-).

Completed action is often expressed by a prefix /kī-/ (in affirmative utterance) and /ohci-/ (in negative utterances) and is commonly used to refer to the past.  For example, /itohtēw/ means "he goes (there) but /kī-itohtēw/ means "he went (there)".

4) Aspect

There is a potential prefix /kī/ (can, be able to) that precedes the root but follows both person and tense prefixes.

The prefix /ati-/ indicates gradual onset (as opposed to sudden beginning).

4*) Some prefixes have more freedom in where they go, such as /pēci/ (in this direction, towards the speaker).

5) Location emphasis:
When a locating expression is used at the beginning of a sentence, the verb contains a prefix /iši-/ as a sort of emphasis and agreement (approximately "thus" or "so"). Ellis describes it as being approximately "At the store do you there work?" If the locating expression does not precede the verb, /iši-/ is not used because it is relative root (so it refers to something that precedes it in the phrase).

6) Root

7) Reciprocal action

Reciprocal action is expressed by the suffix /-ito-/, occurring between the stem and the normal inflection.

8) Inflectional suffix

9) Causative:
The causative suffix /-hēw/ can be added to verbs in order to change it to a causative verb. For example, itohtēw means "He goes there," and ihotahēw means "He takes him there."

Animate intransitive verbs
Animate intransitive verbs are intransitive verbs that have an animate subject.

Inanimate intransitive verbs
These verbs are often the equivalent of the English construction that begins with the empty subject "it" (examples: it is raining, it is snowing, it is day, it is poison, etc.):
 tahk (cold) --> tahkāyāw (it is cold)
 tipisk (night) --> tipiskāw (it is night)
 kīšik (sky) --> kīšikāw (it is day)

Some of the elements, such as "tahk-", cannot stand on their own, but others are free morphemes, such as "kīšik".

Unsurprisingly, first and second person never appear in this context, leaving only the third person and obviative forms.

Transitive animate verbs
Transitive animate verbs whose object is animate, but not all nouns that are part of the "animate" gender are animate in the traditional sense of the word. For example, "wharf" is animate . The distinction between "transitive" and "intransitive" in Cree is not the same as in English. For example, thinking and coughing always take an object ("itēlihtam" --> "he thinks (it)"  and "ostostotam" --> "he coughs (it)").

Independent Indicative

Conjunct Indicative

Conjunct Subjunctive

Transitive inanimate verbs
Transitive inanimate verbs are of, basically, two types: Type 1 are those with a stem that ends in a consonant (ex: "wāpaht-am" --> "he sees it") and Type 2 are those where the transitive inanimate stem end in a vowel. The verbs take the same endings as their animate intransitive counterparts (ex: ayā-w --> "she has it"). There are also verbs that some Algonquian linguists describe as "pseudo-transitive" verbs.  Ellis groups them with Type 2 transitive inanimate verbs because they also function like transitive inanimate verbs while taking animate intransitive endings (example: "wāpahtam sīpīliw" --> "he sees the river").

Particles
These are forms that are never inflected.  Preverbal particles can be added to already independent verbs in order to add meaning. Some particles can occur only as preverbal particles, others can occur only as independent words, and still others are preverbal with some verbs and independent with others:

 ohcitaw = purposely (always independent)
 pihci- = accidentally (always preverbal, dependent)
 wīpac = early, soon (always independent)
 pwāstaw = late (sometimes independent, sometimes dependent)

Syntax

Conjunct order
Verbs in their conjunct form are the equivalent of English dependent clause. One use of the conjunct form can be used to express purpose. For example, Kī-pēc'-ītohtēw nā kici-otāpēt (Did he come to haul {wood}?)

Verbs in their conjunct form occasionally have other form of morphemes. For example, the aspect markers are as follows: /kā-/ = completed aspect/past time, /kē-/ = future time, /ē-/ = the verb in the dependent clause is going on at the same time as that in the main clause.

The negative particle used in Conjunct Order is /ēkā/.

Relative construction
Relative construction is expressed by the completive aspect marker /ka-/ with the verb in the Conjunct Order. For example, atāwēw (he trades), but kā-atāwēt (the one who trades --> a trader).

Indirect speech
While Cree prefers direct reported speech, it is possible to make indirect speech constructions by using the aorist marker /e-/ in addition to other aspect markers.

The Changed Conjunct
The Changed Conjunct changes the vowels of the first syllable of a verb as follows:
 /i/ becomes /ē/
 /a/ becomes /ē/
 /o/ becomes /wē/
 /ī/ becomes /ā/
 /ē/ becomes /iyē/
 /ā/ becomes /iyā/

It can be used to express the difference between Present General and Present-Time questions. That is the difference between "Do you speak Cree?" and "Are you speaking Cree?" Present-Time questions use the prefix /ka-/ without any vowel change.  Present General questions use no prefix and change the vowel according to the paradigm above.

It can also be used in Vivid Narrative for effect, but it sounds outdated to modern-day speakers.

Grammatical cases
Swampy Cree nouns have three cases: nominative, vocative and locative (sometimes referred to as "mention-case", "address-case" and "oblique case" respectively). The vocative case remains as a form distinct from the nominative only for a few words, such as nōhtā - (my) father. The locative case is expressed by the suffix /-ihk/, which means in/at/on/to.

Questions
Yes/no questions are formed by adding the question marker "nā" to the first full word of the sentence:  
"kimawāpin nā?"   Are you visiting?
"Tāpwē nā?"   Really?

Content questions use not "nā" but a special form of the verb. The structure of the sentence then reads: question word - predicate (in conjunct form).  Because verbs in their conjunct form do not use prefixes but express the subject as part of the suffix, the form of the sentence can be described as Question word - Verb - (Object) - Subject (with VOS all one word).

Negation
The negative particle "mōla" is use before the person prefix of a verb and before any particles that directly modify and precede it:
"Mōla nikihtohtān"   I'm not going away.
"Mōla māskōc wīpac nētē nika-ihtān"    I shall probably not be there soon.

Indirect objects
In English, with verbs like "give, show, lend, etc.", it is often said that the verb takes a direct and an indirect object, and the recipient is the indirect object. In Cree, the recipient is considered the immediate object. The object being given is then moved over one more "slot". That is of importance especially when one deals with two third-person objects. In the sentence, "John gave Mary the book," Mary would be in the third person, and the book would be in the obviative.

Verbs of being
The verb of being "ihtāw" (he is) is only ever used in the context of "he is in some location." Equational sentences often require no verb, but the verbalizer /-iw/ the stem-vowel /-i/ (animate) or /-a/ (inanimate)  and the inflectional /-w/ (animate) or /-n/ (inanimate) can be added to nouns in order to express "He/she/it is a something" or "He/she/it displays the characteristics of a something." For example, acimošiš (puppy) + "iwiw" = "acimošišiwiw" (He is a puppy), while "cīmān" (boat/canoe) + "iwan" = "cīmāniwan" (It is a boat/canoe).

Literature
Portions of the Bible were translated into Swampy Cree by Rev James Hunter and his wife Jean, who was a Cree speaker. The first publication in Roman characters, was the Gospel of Matthew by James Hunter. This was published on the Church Mission Society mission press in 1853. This was followed by the First Epistle of John (Nistum Oo Mamowe Mussina̔humakāwin John) translated by Jean Hunter in 1855, who also translated many hymns. Most of these were reprinted by the British and Foreign Bible Society (BFBS) in London: the Book of Psalms (David Oo Nikumoona), the Gospel of Mark (Oo Meyo Achimoowin St Mark) and the Gospel of John (Oo Meyo Achimoowin St John) were published in 1876. Matthew (Oo Meyo Achimoowin St Matthew) was published in 1877. Further selections of Scripture, including the Psalms, were published in the Prayer Book which was published in 1877.

Author David Robertson published a Swampy Cree version of his book, When We Were Alone. He also used Swampy Cree and inserted a glossary of the language in his book, The Barren Grounds, which is part of The Misewa Series.

Notes

References

Ellis, Clarence Douglas. 1983. Spoken Cree. Second Edition. Edmonton: Pica Pica Press. 
Ellis, Clarence Douglas. 1981. Spoken Cree. Revised Edition. Edmonton: Pica Pica Press. 
Ellis, Clarence Douglas. 1995. âtalôhkâna nêsta tipâcimôwina: Cree Legends and Narratives from the West Coast of James Bay. Text and Translation. Edited and with a Glossary by Ellis, C. Douglas. Winnipeg: University of Manitoba Press. 
Rhodes, Richard and Evelyn Todd. 1981. “Subarctic Algonquian Languages.” June Helm, ed., The Handbook of North American Indians, Volume 6. Subarctic, pp. 52–66. Washington, D.C.: The Smithsonian Institution.
Wolfart, H.C. and Carroll, Janet F.. 1981. Meet Cree: A Guide to the Cree Language. Edmonton: University of Alberta Press.

External links
 Native Languages: A Support Document for the Teaching of Language Patterns – Basic language patterns for Ojibwe (Manitoulin Ojibwe/Ottawa "CO" and Lac Seul Ojibwe "WO") and Cree (Swampy Cree "SC").
 Path of the Elders  – Explore Treaty 9, Aboriginal Cree & First Nations history.
OLAC resources in and about the Swampy Cree language
Voices from Hudson Bay: Cree Stories from York Factory (2nd Ed.). 1993. Beardy, F., & Coutts R. McGill-McQueen's University Press. Quebec, Canada.

Cree language
Central Algonquian languages
Indigenous languages of the North American eastern woodlands
First Nations languages in Canada
Swampy Cree